"Questions" is a song by American singer Chris Brown from his eighth studio album, Heartbreak on a Full Moon (2017). It was released by RCA Records as the fifth single from the album on August 16, 2017.

The song is a dancehall track written by Brown, Christopher Dotson, Melvin Moore and Bobby Turner Jr., while its production was handled by Pip Kembo, B HAM, A1. The single achieved a good commercial success worldwide, being certified gold in Canada, New Zealand, Denmark and Switzerland, and platinum in Australia, United Kingdom and United States.

A "colorful" videoclip for the song was released on August 16, 2017. The music video shows Brown and a group of ladies execute a dancing choreography.

Background and release
In September 2016, in a then deleted video from his Instagram account, Brown previewed some sections of the song whilst painting in his house. Fans speculated that the song was a cover of Kevin Lyttle’s 2003 single  "Turn Me On". 

In July 2017, he announced the pending release of upcoming singles from his album. Later on August 4, 2017, he released "Pills & Automobiles", that features guest vocals from American trap artists Yo Gotti, A Boogie Wit Da Hoodie and Kodak Black, then on August 14, 2017, he announced the dropping of the fifth official single from the album, Heartbreak on a Full Moon, for August 16, which was "Questions". The song leaked online a week before its actual release, though, with iTunes versions appearing online on August 11th, it’s believed that the track was prematurely released onto iTunes in select countries before being taken down. With these versions, the cover art was simply a black picture.

Composition
"Questions" is an uptempo dancehall song with pop influences, with a bouncy island beat produced by A1 Bentley, Pip Kembo and B HAM that samples Kevin Lyttle’s 2003 hit song "Turn Me On". In the song Brown asks to a girl that catches his eye if he could take her home for the night.

Music video
On August 16, 2017, Brown uploaded the music video for "Questions" on his YouTube and Vevo account. Amy Sciarretto of PopCrush described the video as a clip "immersed in colorful scenarios where Brown showcases his dancing skills".

Track listing
Digital download
"Questions" – 2:09

Charts

Weekly charts

Year-end charts

Certifications

References

 

2017 singles
2017 songs
Chris Brown songs
RCA Records singles
Songs written by Chris Brown
Songs written by Christopher Dotson
Songs written by Lyrica Anderson
Songs written by Daron Jones
Songs written by Slim (singer)
Songs written by Quinnes Parker
Songs written by Hitmaka